Georg August Paul Freiherr von Stackelberg was a Baltic German cavalry general in the service of the Imperial Russian Army. He was noted for his role during the Russo-Japanese War, especially during the Battle of Sandepu, in which he was awarded the Order of St. George afterwards.

Biography 
Stackelberg was from a Baltic German noble family and graduated from the Nicholas General Staff Academy in 1869. His older brother Konstantin was a famous composer and the director of the Imperial Music Choir. (now the St. Petersburg Philharmonic Orchestra)

As a commander in the 1st Semirechye Cossacks from 1874 to 1876, Stackelberg distinguished himself during the Russian conquest of the Khanate of Khiva and the Kokand expedition of 1875 under General Konstantin von Kaufman. He was wounded in combat, and although nominated for numerous awards, he refused to accept any.

From August 18, 1886, to December 5, 1890, Stackelberg commanded the 25th Dragoon Regiment at Kazan. He was then assigned to command the Trans-Caspian Cossacks until December 3, 1897, followed by the 15th Cavalry Division to May 31, 1899.

Stackelberg was commander of the Russian 10th Cavalry Division during the suppression of the Boxer Rebellion in China and Russian occupation of Manchuria. Afterwards, he was assigned command of the 2nd Siberian Army Corps from April 25, 1901, to February 11, 1902. He was then commander of the 1st Cavalry Corps from February 11, 1902, to February 3, 1904.

From April 5, 1904, during the Russo-Japanese War, Stackelberg was commander of the Russian 1st Siberian Army Corps, which played a major role in the Battle of Te-li-Ssu. Hampered by orders from Russian commander-in-chief General Aleksei Kuropatkin not to commit his entire reserves, and to fight a defensive battle rather than push forward in an offense, his forces were decisively defeated by the Second Japanese Army under General Oku Yasukata. In the subsequent Battle of Sandepu, Stackelberg chose to ignore Kuropatkin's orders and made gains against entrenched Japanese positions, albeit with heavy casualties, but was forced to withdraw when reinforcements were denied. Relieved of his command for insubordination, he was sent back to St Petersburg after the battle, where he was awarded the Order of St. George (4th class) for his actions.

Honours and awards 
  Order of St. Stanislaus, 3rd class 
  Order of St. Anne 3rd class with Swords
  Order of St. Stanislaus, 2nd class with swords (1873)
  Order of St. Vladimir, 4th class with Swords (1876)
  Order of St. Anne 2nd class with Swords (1877)
  Order of St. Stanislaus, 1st class (1894)
  Order of St. Anne 1st class (1898)
  Order of St. Vladimir, 2nd class with Swords (1901)
  Order of the White Eagle (1901)
  Order of St. Alexander Nevsky (1905)
  Order of St. George, 4th class (1905)
  Golden Weapon with the inscription "For Bravery"  (1876)

References

Notes

1851 births
1913 deaths
Baltic-German people
Imperial Russian Army generals
Russian military personnel of the Russo-Turkish War (1877–1878)
Russian military personnel of the Boxer Rebellion
Russian military personnel of the Russo-Japanese War
Recipients of the Order of Saint Stanislaus (Russian), 2nd class
Recipients of the Order of St. Anna, 1st class
Recipients of the Order of St. Vladimir, 2nd class
Recipients of the Gold Sword for Bravery